Malta is a country in Europe.

Malta may also refer to:

Places

Malta
Malta (European Parliament constituency)
Malta (island), the main island of the country
Malta Majjistral, a former statistical region of Malta
Malta Xlokk, a former statistical region of Malta

Austria
Malta, Austria, a town

Brazil
Malta, Paraíba, a municipality in the Northeast Region

Latvia
, a village in Malta Parish
, a village in Viļāni Parish
Malta parish, an administrative unit in Rēzekne Municipality
Malta (river)

Nepal
Malta, Bagmati, a village
Malta, Kosi, a village

Poland
Malta, Lubusz Voivodeship, a village in west Poland
Lake Malta, an artificial lake in Poznań, Poland

Portugal
, a freguesia in Vila do Conde

Russia
Malta, Russia, a rural locality in Usolsky District, Irkutsk Oblast

United States
Malta, Idaho, a city
Malta, Illinois, a village
Malta, Montana, a city
Malta (Amtrak station), a train station in Malta, Montana
Malta, New York, a town
Malta, Ohio, a village
Malta, Texas, a village
Malta Township, Big Stone County, Minnesota
Windsor, Maine, formerly Malta

Arts and entertainment
Malta (band), a Swedish band
, Brazilian rock band that win the first Superstar TV show
, Japanese jazz/fusion saxophonist
Malta Festival Poznań, an annual theatre festival in Poznań, Poland
A fictional character in The Sea Prince and the Fire Child

Other uses 
Malta (1807 ship)
Malta (soft drink), a type of malt beverage
Malta (newspaper), former Maltese newspaper
Joseph Malta (1918–1999), United States Army hangman who carried out the Nuremberg executions
Order of Malta, a Catholic religious order and sovereign entity primarily based in Rome.
A letter in the Tengwar script

See also
Knights of Malta, a religious order first formed in Jerusalem circa 1099 AD
Sovereign Military Order of Malta, the modern successor to the medieval Knights Hospitaller
Malta Convention, an international agreement on archaeological heritage sites
Malta fever or brucellosis, a highly contagious zoonosis
Malta Boat Club, a rowing club located on Philadelphia's Boathouse Row
Mal'ta, ancient culture of Siberia